A water crane is a device used for delivering a large volume of water into the tank or tender of a steam locomotive. The device is also called a water column in the United States and Australia. As a steam locomotive consumes large quantities of water, water cranes were a vital part of railway station equipment, often situated at the end of a platform, so that water could be refilled during a stop at the station.

Overview
The swinging arm is usually designed to rest parallel to the rails when not in use.

Water supply
In hilly country, natural streams can be dammed and water fed by gravity to the water crane. In flatter country this arrangement is not always possible, so water may be supplied by a tank next to the crane. In some cases a well may be used to supply the water to the tank.

Depending on the quality of the water under supply, it may need to be treated chemically to eliminate hardness which induces scale buildup on the inside of the locomotive boiler. The scale which builds up on heat transfer surfaces forms a layer of insulation between the metal of the firebox and the boiler water. This causes metal to overheat or corrode and eventually fail.

See also 

Water stop
Track pan (US) (water trough (UK))

References

Railway buildings and structures
Steam locomotive technologies